The  International Assistance Group (IAG) is a global alliance of independent assistance companies providing worldwide: medical assistance, travel assistance, roadside assistance, home assistance, employee assistance and legal assistance. 
Every year, IAG handles more than 10 million cases including nearly 50,000 repatriations on behalf of insurance companies, tour operators, corporations, governments and non-profit organisations.

History 
Founded in 1992, IAG was originally created by five European companies seeking to help one another provide high-quality services. Considerable growth over the past 25 years means that IAG are now among the world’s largest alliances of independent assistance companies and accredited providers.

International Assistance Group today 
As July 2021 The International Assistance Group has over 140 partners, correspondents and Accredited Service Providers (ASPs) with an aggregated turnover of €1.5 billion, with 15,000 staff working through 150 24/7 alarm centres around the world and over 154 million travellers are supported by the International Assistance Group's members. The International Assistance Group is a closely linked network with common goals, shared database, shareholding position, and regular meetings and internal forums to encourage exchange of information and know-how among its partners. The International Assistance Group is also an innovative network model as it provides access to a comprehensive international network of locally independent and autonomous quality assistance experts.

International Assistance Group Partners 
1992 – International Care Company (Italy) (formerly FD Service)
1994 – World Travel Protection (Canada)
1994 – Athens Assistance (Greece)
1994 – SOS International (Netherlands)
1994 – Medicall (Switzerland)
1995 – Omint (Argentina)
2001 – Remed Assistance (Turkey)
2001 – Global Voyager Assistance (Russia)
2001 – On Call International (USA)
2003 – World Travel Protection (Australia)
2003 – Iké Asistencia México (Mexico)
2003 – Netcare 911  (South Africa)
2004 – Filassistance (France)
2005 - Wtw Services Sp. Z O.o. (Poland)
2006 – Iké Asistencia Brazil (Brazil)
2006 – Iké Asistencia Colombia (Colombia)
2008 - World Travel Protection (New Zealand)
2010 – Global Doctor (China)
2010 – Maroc Assistance Internationale (Morocco)
2011 – Premium Assistance  (Brazil)
2012 – Egypt Assistance (Egypt)
2012 – Cover More AOL (China)
2012 – Mutas (Belgium)
2012 – MOK (Chile)
2012 – MSO International (South Africa)
2012 – REVA (USA)
2012 – RACC (Spain)
2012 – European Air Ambulance (Luxembourg)
2012 – One Call Medical Transports (USA)
2012 - Medicis Assistance (Ivory Coast)
2013 - East West Rescue (India)
2013 - EMA Finland Oy (Finland)
2013 - FAI (Germany)
2013 – Tyrol Air Ambulance (Austria)
2013 - Fox Flight (Canada)
2014 - REGA (Switzerland)
2014 - Airlink Air Ambulance (Mexico/USA)
2014 – MD Medicus (Germany)
2014 - Rede Nacional de Assistencia (Portugal)
2014 - Albin International Repatriation (UK)
2015 - Iran Assistance (Iran)
2015 - Healix International (UK)
2015 - AirCARE1 (USA)
2015 - Hygeia Hospital (Greece)
2015 - New Zealand Air Ambulance Service (New Zealand)
2016 - AA International Indonesia (Indonesia)
2017 – Ace Air & Ambulance (Zimbabwe)
2017 - AVD Wirtschaftsdienst GmbH (Germany) 
2017 – Global Assistance Partners (South Korea) 
2017 – Balkanwide Assistance (Serbia)
2017 – Airlec Air Espace (France)
2017 – EMA Global (Singapore)
2017 – G7 Mortuary Shipping (Colombia)
2017 – Japan Assist International (Japan)
2017 – Medical Air (Australia)
2017 – International West Indies Assistance (Martinique)
2017 – AMREF Flying Doctors (Kenya)
2017 - April Assistance (Thailand)
2017 - Carejet (Philippines)
2018 - AA International Taiwan (Taiwan)
2018 - Healthlink (China)
2018 - TBS Team 24 (Slovenia)
2018 - Aeroambulancia by Helidosa Aviation Group (Dominican Republic)
2018 - Assistance Plus (Madagascar)
2018 - Eutelmed (France)
2018 - Redstar Aviation (Turkey)
2018 - Trails of Indochina (Vietnam)
2018 - World Med Assistance (France)
2019 - Flying Doctors Nigeria (Nigeria)
2019 - Gateway International EMS (USA)
2019 - EMA Finland (Finland)
2019 - Japan Assist International Co., Ltd (Japan)
2019 - Wellbe Holdings Limited (Hong Kong)
2019 - Brasil Vida Taxi Aereo (Brazil)
2019 - Medical Rescue (Australia)
2019 - Get-E International Airport Services (The Netherlands)
2019 - UTA Assistance (Jordan)
2019 - Hi Flying - Air Ambulance International (India)]
2019 - Capital Air Ambulance (United Kingdom)
2019 - Bharti Assistance (India)
2020 - UTA Assistance (UAE)
2020 - GlobeMed (Lebanon)
2020 - Pacific Cross (Vietnam)
2020 - MLP Care (Turkey)
2021 - Travel Support Holland

Awards and recognition 
IAG holds ISO 9001 certification since 2018 and the ISO 26000 Label since 2020.

References

External links 
 

Service companies of France
 
Emergency medical services
Medical services